Bubastoides is a genus of beetles in the family Buprestidae, containing the following species:

 Bubastoides argodi Kerremans, 1909
 Bubastoides kadleci Bily, 2008

References

Buprestidae genera